Africanogyrus is a genus of air-breathing freshwater snail, an aquatic pulmonate gastropod mollusk in the family Planorbidae, the ram's horn snails and their allies.

In 2007 the genus Afrogyrus was defined as a junior homonym and Africanogyrus was proposed as a replacement name. Africanogyrus would replace Afrogyrus Brown & Mandahl-Barth, 1973 [not the same thing as Afrogyrus Brinck, 1955]. In turn, Africanogyrus has become a synonym of Hovorbis D.S. Brown & Mandahl-Barth, 1973

Species
The genus Afrogyrus used contains four species, all of which have become synonyms:
 Africanogyrus coretus (de Blainville, 1826): synonym of Hovorbis coretus (de Blainville, 1826)
 Africanogyrus crassilabrum (Morelet, 1860): synonym of Hovorbis crassilabrum (Morelet, 1860)
 Africanogyrus rodriguezensis (Crosse, 1873) (synonym: Afrogyrus rodriguezensis): synonym of Hovorbis rodriguezensis (Crosse, 1873)
 Africanogyrus starmuehlneri (Brown, 1980) (synonym: Afrogyrus starmuehlneri): synonym of Hovorbis starmuehlneri (Brown, 1980)

References

Further reading 
 Brown D. S. (2001). "Taxonomy, biogeography and phylogeny of the non-lacustrine African freshwater snails belonging to the genera Ceratophallus and Afrogyrus (Mollusca: Planorbidae)". Journal of Zoology 255(1): 55-82. .

Planorbidae
Taxonomy articles created by Polbot